Weatherwise is a magazine founded by David M. Ludlum and was published by Heldref Publications in Washington DC, but now is published by Taylor & Francis Group. It covers weather and climate for weather enthusiasts as well as meteorologists and climatologists and is the only popular press publication in the United States to do so. It is richly illustrated with large color photographs that showcase the power, beauty and excitement of weather. Articles are published on the latest discoveries and topics in meteorology, usually using experts in the respective field to write the article. Articles tend to focus on the relation of weather to technology, history, culture, the arts, and society. The magazine releases an annual almanac to highlight key topics that happened internationally, in the U.S. and corresponding hurricane and tornado seasons. The magazine also features commentaries, photography contests, questions and answers, and weather maps.

References

External links
 Weatherwise magazine homepage

1947 establishments in Washington, D.C.
Bimonthly magazines published in the United States
Magazines established in 1947
Magazines published in Philadelphia
Magazines published in Washington, D.C.
Science and technology magazines published in the United States
Taylor & Francis academic journals